The Singapore women's national field hockey team represents Singapore in international field hockey competitions.

Tournament record

Asian Games
 1982 – 5th
 1990 – 6th
 1994 – 6th
 2022 – Qualified

Asia Cup
 1985 – 4th
 1993 – 6th
 2004 – 7th
 2007 – 9th
 2009 – 8th
 2017 – 8th
 2022 – 7th

AHF Cup
 1997 – 
 2003 – 
 2012 – 5th
 2016 –

FIH Hockey Series
2018–19 – First round

See also
Singapore men's national field hockey team

References

External links
Official website
FIH profile

Asian women's national field hockey teams
Field hockey
National team